Donercius or Donort is the second Bishop of Mortlach according to the list of the Aberdeen Registrum. He is known only by name. Skene says that "Donercius has all the appearance of a fictitious name". Whether the name is fictitious or a corruption cannot be known from the existing evidence. His alleged predecessor Beóán is known to have been bishop in the reign of King Máel Coluim II of Scotland, so if Donercius really did exist, he was certainly bishop in the 11th century.

Notes

References
 Innes, Cosmo, Registrum episcopatus Aberdonensis : ecclesie Cathedralis Aberdonensis regesta que extant in unum collecta, 2 Vols, (Spalding and Maitland Clubs, 1845), Vol. II
 William Forbes Skene|Skene, William Forbes, Celtic Scotland: A History of Ancient Alban, 2nd ed., (Edinburgh, 1887), vol. ii

11th-century deaths
Medieval Gaels from Scotland
12th-century Scottish Roman Catholic bishops
Year of birth unknown